Opisthiolepis is a genus of a sole described species of large trees, constituting part of the plant family Proteaceae. The species Opisthiolepis heterophylla most commonly has the names of blush silky oak, pink silky oak, brown silky oak and drunk rabbit.

While restricted to this region, within their range they occur widely in rainforests, more common in the tablelands and mountains and described as common on the Atherton Tableland.

Taxonomy and naming
Queensland botanist Lindsay Smith named the species in 1952, from a collection from the Atherton area in the Cook District. Material had been collected earlier by C.T. White in 1918, but lacked flowers or fruit.

They are reported to share their evolutionary closest correlates with the genera Buckinghamia, Finschia, Grevillea and Hakea in the subtribe Hakeinae. The genetics studies, still at an early stage, suggest Opisthiolepis may represent the continuing living lineage of the ancient branch off from near the base or from before the base of the entire present day subtribe Hakeinae.

Description
Oval or oblong in shape, the adult leaves are anywhere from 2 to 23 cm long by 2 to 9 cm wide. They have bronze undersurfaces.

Distribution and habitat
Found from sea level to 1150 m, Opisthiolepis heterophylla is endemic to northeastern Queensland. It generally grows on basalt soils on slopes and elevated areas, in rainforest.

Cultivation

References

External links
 View a map of recorded sightings of Opisthiolepis heterophylla at the Australasian Virtual Herbarium

Proteaceae
Monotypic Proteaceae genera
Proteales of Australia
Trees of Australia
Endemic flora of Queensland
Wet Tropics of Queensland